This is a list of the National Register of Historic Places listings in Cuyahoga Valley National Park.

This is intended to be a complete list of the properties and districts on the National Register of Historic Places in Cuyahoga Valley National Park, Ohio, United States.  The locations of National Register properties and districts for which the latitude and longitude coordinates are included below, may be seen in a Google map.

There are 61 properties and districts listed on the National Register in the park, one of which is a National Historic Landmark.

Current listings 

|--
|}

See also 

 National Register of Historic Places listings in Akron, Ohio
 National Register of Historic Places listings in Cuyahoga County, Ohio
 National Register of Historic Places listings in Summit County, Ohio
 List of National Historic Landmarks in Ohio
 National Register of Historic Places listings in Ohio

References 

Miller, Carol Poh. National Register of Historic Places Inventory - Nomination Form: Ohio and Erie Canal. National Park Service November 20, 1978 
National Register of Historic Places Multiple Property Documentation Form Form: Agricultural Resources of the Cuyahoga Valley. National Park Service November 20, 1978 
Winstel, Jeff; Mulhauser, Kurt. National Register of Historic Places Multiple Property Documentation Form: Recreation and Conservation Resources of Cuyahoga Valley 1870-1945. National Park Service October 3, 1994 

Cuyahoga Valley